Hillberg Helicopters was an American aircraft manufacturer based in Fountain Valley, California and founded by Donald Gene Hillberg. The company specialized in the design and manufacture of helicopters in the form of kits for amateur construction.

The company offered a turbine conversion kit for the Rotorway Exec, using a Solar T62 auxiliary power unit engine to create the Hillberg Turbine Exec. The Hillberg EH1-01 RotorMouse was a single-seat helicopter with stub-wings. At least one example of each design was flown.

A Hillberg EH1-02 TandemMouse, two-seats-in-tandem version of the RotorMouse design was proposed and construction of a prototype commenced.

Aircraft

References

Helicopters
Homebuilt aircraft
Defunct aircraft manufacturers of the United States
Defunct manufacturing companies based in Greater Los Angeles
Fountain Valley, California